Tournan station (French: Gare de Tournan) is a hub in the French transport network enabling travellers to reach the region around Tournan-en-Brie (Seine-et-Marne, Ile-de-France). This place provides an easy connection to other forms of road transport. It is a railway station serving the town Tournan-en-Brie, Seine-et-Marne department, northern France. It is on the line from Gretz-Armainvilliers to Sézanne.

See also 

 List of Réseau Express Régional stations
 List of SNCF stations in Île-de-France
 List of Transilien stations

External links

 

Réseau Express Régional stations
Railway stations in Seine-et-Marne
Railway stations in France opened in 1861